Theodore Dennison Doyle (January 12, 1914October 6, 2006) was a professional American football tackle and guard who played for eight seasons. He was drafted by the New York Giants in the 8th round of the 68th pick in the 1938 NFL draft. He played college football at the University of Nebraska and played for the Nebraska Cornhuskers football team.

Theodore Doyle played in the National Football League from 1938 until 1945. He is best known for playing guard for the Pittsburgh Pirates and as they would later be known as, the Pittsburgh Steelers. Doyle also played for both of the merger teams the Steelers would be involved in. In 1943 the Steelers merged their team with the Philadelphia Eagles to form what sportswriters would call the "Steagles". The two teams merged due to manning shortages that were felt league-wide due to World War II. A year later the Steelers merged their team again, this time with the Chicago Cardinals to form "Card-Pitt". When he wasn't playing football, Doyle worked six days a week at the Westinghouse Electric Company during the war. It was later discovered that he had a small part in the Manhattan Project, America's effort to build the atomic bomb.

Decades later Doyle referred to his time with Card-Pitt as "a strange time". He was spending six days a week working for Westinghouse on war projects, and then on Sunday he would play football. He stated that playing for Card-Pitt was not a lot of fun and said sometimes that only a couple hundred people would show up for a game. According to Doyle, many players kept hoping that the war would finally end because once it did, all player contracts would become void.

Once the war ended, Doyle played one last season, for the Steelers.

Prior to his professional career, Doyle played college football at the University of Nebraska from 1935 until 1937. He was later inducted into the school's football hall of fame in 1990. He died in 2006 of heart respiratory disease.

References

1914 births
2006 deaths
People from Frontier County, Nebraska
Players of American football from Nebraska
American football offensive guards
American football tackles
Nebraska Cornhuskers football players
Card-Pitt players
Chicago Cardinals players
Philadelphia Eagles players
Pittsburgh Pirates (football) players
Pittsburgh Steelers players
Steagles players and personnel